Eryngium campestre, known as field eryngo, or Watling Street thistle, is a species of Eryngium, which is used medicinally.  A member of the family Apiaceae, eryngo is a hairless, thorny perennial plant. The leaves are tough and stiff, whitish-green.  The basal leaves are long-stalked, pinnate and spiny. The leaves of this plant are mined by the gall fly, Euleia heraclei.

Description
Eryngium campestre is a stiff, hairless, prickly perennial plant. It resembles the better known sea holly (Eryngium maritimum), but is taller and less robust, and the stem and leaves are paler and not bluish-green. The palmate leaves have more slender lobes which are tipped with spines, and the bracts below the flower heads are slender. The stems are thinner, the branches are longer and the globular flower heads are white and much smaller than the sea holly. This plant flowers between July and September.

Distribution and habitat
Eryngium campestre has a mainly Central and Southern Europe distribution, north to Germany and Holland. It is common in many places but in Germany it is restricted to dry habitats near the Rivers Rhine and Elbe. It is very uncommon in dry grassland on neutral or calcareous soils in the southeast of the British Isles, having first been recorded in 1662 by the naturalist John Ray in Devon. It has statutory protection in Somerset and Devon and is persisting in several sites there, but elsewhere it is mostly a short-lived casual of waste ground, road verges and rough pastures.

Uses
Used in herbalism as an infusion to treat coughs, whooping cough and urinary infections. Roots were formerly candied as sweets or boiled and roasted as a vegetable.  The plants active constituents are essential oils, saponins, tannins.

References

External links

USDA Plants: Eryngium campestre
Plant Profile of the Botanical Society of Britain and Ireland: Eryngium campestre 
 Distribution Map of Eryngium campestre in continental France (Telebotanica) 

campestre
Flora of Europe
Plants described in 1753
Taxa named by Carl Linnaeus
Flora of Lebanon